M8 highway may refer to:

 M8 highway (Russia)
 M8 highway (Azerbaijan)